Richard Carey Davis formerly served as the mayor of San Bernardino, California. He served as the 28th mayor of the city. Davis was elected mayor in 2014. He lost the general election on November 6, 2018, after advancing from the primary on June 5, 2018.

Early life and education
Davis was born in San Bernardino and graduated from Pacific High School there. He received his bachelor's degree from Cal Poly San Luis Obispo and his Master of Business Administration from California State University, San Bernardino.

Career
Davis is a certified public accountant, who works as a controller in Los Angeles for Hehr International, a manufacturer of RV doors and windows.

He became involved in city politics in spring 2013. He ran for mayor in a ten-candidate field and in the November 5, 2013, election gained second place, being narrowly edged for first place by 7th Ward city council member Wendy McCammack. Davis and McCammack then proceeded to a February 4, 2014, runoff election, in which Davis defeated Wendy McCammack; turnout was low. He was sworn in on March 3, 2014.

References 

American accountants
Living people
California Polytechnic State University alumni
California State University, San Bernardino alumni
Year of birth missing (living people)
Mayors of San Bernardino, California
California Republicans
21st-century American politicians